Hydroelectricity is a major form of energy supply in Bulgaria. The country's HEP stations have over a quarter of the country's entire installed capacity for electricity production (2 713 MW of a total of 9 728 MW, or 27.9%) (p. 11)(p. 32), and in 2010 they provided 10.2% of the country's total supply (4 224 GWh of a total of 41 570 GWh).(p. 32)(p. 32)

The 15 largest HEP stations, all owned by the state-run National Electricity Company, account for 97% of the country's HEP installed capacity and produce 94% of all HEP power.(p. 12,p. 32) They are arranged in four series, or "cascades", of between 3 and 5 reservoirs, and all are located in the Rhodope mountains in Southwestern Bulgaria. Three of the stations are pumped-storage stations ("PS-HPP").(p. 14) Some analysts say that further modernization, such as of its pumped storage hydro, could be profitable.

Power plants 

NEK also owns and looks after several large dams which are either used for providing fresh water only, to store water for HPPs downriver, or else have provided HEP power in the past but have ceased to do so.(p. 15-17) These include –

There is also a project for an "Upper Arda Cascade", which has been delayed due to complications. This cascade should include three HPPs at Madan, Ardino and Kitnitsa.

See also 
Wind power in Bulgaria
Solar power in Bulgaria
Renewable energy by country

References